The ESF Co-Ed Slowpitch European Championships is a championship tournament between national coeducational softball teams in Europe, governed by the European Softball Federation.

The 2017 tournament will take place in Sofia, Bulgaria between July 11 and July 15. There are six teams participating in the 2017 championship: Bulgaria, Czech Republic, Germany, Great Britain, Ireland and Slovenia.

The 2021 Slowpitch European Championships were cancelled due to COVID-19. The current European champions are Great Britain who beat Germany, 12-7, in the Championship game in Ljubljana, Slovenia.

Results

Medal table

References

External links
European Softball Federation

European Softball Championship